Guillaume De Schryver (born 4 November 1996) is a Belgian footballer who plays for Lierse Kempenzonen in the Belgian First Division B as a centre midfielder.

Club career
Guillaume De Schryver started his career with Cercle Brugge.

On 3 May 2021, he joined Lierse Kempenzonen on a one-year contract.

References

External links
 

1996 births
Living people
Belgian footballers
Challenger Pro League players
Club Brugge KV players
Standard Liège players
Cercle Brugge K.S.V. players
K.V.C. Westerlo players
Lierse Kempenzonen players
Association football midfielders